Sir John Thomas Buller Duckworth, 2nd Baronet (17 March 1809 – 29 November 1887) was a British Conservative politician.

Duckworth was the son of his namesake John Duckworth and Susanna Catherine Buller. He married Mary Isabella Buller, daughter of John and Harriet Buller, in 1850, and they had three children: Mary Georgiana (born 1852); Evelyn Harriet (born 1857); and, Fanny Catherine (born 1860). He inherited the baronetcy of Topsham in 1817 on the death of his father.

Duckworth was elected Conservative MP for Exeter at a by-election in 1845—caused by the death of William Webb Follett—and held the seat until 1857 when he did not seek re-election at that year's general election.

References

External links
 

1809 births
1887 deaths
Conservative Party (UK) MPs for English constituencies
UK MPs 1841–1847
UK MPs 1847–1852
UK MPs 1852–1857
Baronets in the Baronetage of the United Kingdom
Members of the Parliament of the United Kingdom for Exeter